Margaret Charlton (10 December 1858 – 1 May 1931) was a pioneering Canadian medical librarian who was instrumental in founding the Association of Medical Librarians, which became the Medical Library Association in 1907. She was the association's first secretary.

Early life 
She was born on December 10, 1858, in La Prairie, Quebec, a small town on the south shore of the St. Lawrence River near Montreal. She was christened Margaret Anne but later changed her second name to Ridley, to honour her descent from the family of the martyred Bishop Nicholas Ridley, who was burnt at the stake in Oxford in 1555.

In addition to being a librarian, she was also a literary journalist and wrote several historical sketches, book reviews and wrote two books with her friend Caroline Augusta Fraser.

Career
The McGill University Medical Library was founded on August 27, 1823. It was part of the university's Faculty of Medicine and, as was common practice in the 19th and early 20th centuries, a faculty member held the title of "Librarian".  Charlton, who had recently completed a summer course at Amherst College in the newly developed field of librarianship, and is thought to have studied under Melvil Dewey, came to this library in 1895. She was appointed to be the library's first Assistant Librarian in 1896. She remained at the McGill Medical Library in this position until 1914, when she resigned under less than happy circumstances, and moved to Toronto as Librarian of the Academy of Medicine.

Charlton was probably the first person with any formal library training to work at McGill University. Her interest in wider library issues was demonstrated shortly after she arrived, as she was reimbursed $55 for the expense of attending a meeting of the American Library Association in Chicago in 1896. The following year, the British and Canadian medical associations held a joint meeting in Montreal, and it was probably here that Charlton first met prominent Canadian physician William Osler. Osler had graduated from McGill in 1872, and after postgraduate studies in Europe he had returned as a faculty member. He left McGill in 1884 to go to the University of Pennsylvania and by 1897 was at Johns Hopkins University in Baltimore. Osler was always interested in, and supportive of, libraries and had served on the Faculty's Library Committee while at McGill. He was almost certainly eager to meet the newly appointed assistant librarian of his alma mater.

It was most likely due to this 1897 meeting that William Osler and Margaret Charlton became involved in the formation of the Association of Medical Librarians, founded on May 2, 1898, by four librarians and four physicians who met in the office of the Philadelphia Medical Journal, at the invitation of its editor, George M. Gould, M.D. The object of the Association was the fostering of medical libraries and the maintenance of an exchange of medical literature among its members.  Membership was limited to librarians representing medical libraries of at least 500 volumes, with regular library hours and attendance.  Miss Charlton served as the Association's first Secretary from 1898 to 1903 and again from 1909 to 1911, after it had become (in 1907) the Medical Library Association. One of the other founding members, Marcia Crocker Noyes (who was to become the first woman and first non-physician President of the Association in 1933), writes of Margaret Charlton as follows:

"Miss Charlton was the one person who indirectly brought the Association into being from speaking with Dr. Osler. She had belonged to the American Library Association. Their problems were not our problems, and she felt lost and that time was wasted, yet she had striven for contact with those doing just the sort of work she was doing. And so she suggested to Dr. Osler that it would be a fine thing if the Medical Libraries could do the same thing the American Library Association was doing."  (Bulletin of the Medical Library Association, 23 (1934): page 33.)

Later life
In 1922 she left the Academy of Medicine, also under less than happy circumstances, and  returned to Montreal to live with her sisters. She died there on May 1, 1931, and is buried, with her mother and two of her three sisters, in Mount Royal Cemetery.

Awards in Her Honor
Margaret Ridley Charlton Award for Outstanding Achievement

At the winter 2004 meeting of the Canadian Health Libraries Association /Association des bibliothèques de la santé du Canada Board of Directors, it was decided to rename the Award for Outstanding Achievement in honour of Margaret Ridley Charlton.

Legacy
In November 2000, Charlton was proposed to the Historic Sites and Monuments Board of Canada as a "person of national historic significance". This board, created in 1919, is responsible for making such recommendations to the Canadian government, and in late 2002 it supported the proposal. In September 2003 the Minister of Canadian Heritage, Sheila Copps, approved the Board's recommendation, and Charlton has been added to the list of approximately 600 other "persons of national historic significance".  In 2006 a Government of Canada plaque honouring her accomplishments was unveiled at the McGill University Life Sciences (formerly Medical) Library and this was erected outside the McIntyre Medical Sciences Building in November 2012 where it is in close proximity to similar plaques to her contemporaries William Osler and Maude Abbott. Additional images at

References

Continuity and Change:  175 years of  the McGill Health Sciences Library. This history, published in 1998, briefly describes the first 175 years of the McGill University Medical (later Health Sciences) Library. The library, the oldest health sciences library in Canada, was founded in 1823.
Historic Sites and Monuments Board of Canada. Submission Report concerning Margaret Ridley Charlton.   This report, written by a Parks Canada historian, provides a brief biography of Miss Charlton, explains her significance to Canada and gives references to some of her publications and to other biographical notes on her career.  
Margaret Charlton and the early days of the Medical Library Association. Presidential address by W.W. Francis, published in Bulletin of the Medical Library Association 1936;25(1):58-63. 
Margaret Charlton on Internatlibs.mcgill.ca  (includes photograph and picture of her Historic Person plaque).Margaret Charlton
Parks Canada. Press Release on Margaret Ridley Charlton's designation as a person of national historic significance -  September 2003. 
Parcs Canada. Communiqué de presse au sujet de la désignation d’importance historique nationale de Margaret Ridley Charlton -  septembre 2003.

External links
 Margaret Ridley Charlton biography at Ex Libris Association

1858 births
1931 deaths
Canadian librarians
Canadian women librarians
Anglophone Quebec people
Ridl
Persons of National Historic Significance (Canada)
Burials at Mount Royal Cemetery